Vigo County is a county on the western border of the U.S. state of Indiana. According to the 2020 United States Census, it had a population of 105,994. Its county seat is Terre Haute.

Vigo County is included in the Terre Haute metropolitan area.

The county contains four incorporated settlements with a total population of nearly 63,000, as well as several unincorporated communities. It is divided into twelve townships which provide local services to the residents.

The county was once regarded as one of the best bellwether regions for voting in U.S. presidential elections; it voted for the winning candidate in every election from 1956 to 2016 and in all but three elections since 1888. Until the streak ended in 2020, only one county in the United States, Valencia County, New Mexico, had voted for the winning candidate longer.

History
In 1787, the fledgling United States defined the Northwest Territory, which included the area of present-day Indiana. In 1800, Congress separated Ohio from the Northwest Territory, designating the rest of the land as the Indiana Territory. President Thomas Jefferson chose William Henry Harrison as the territory's first governor, and Vincennes was established as the territorial capital. After the Michigan Territory was separated and the Illinois Territory was formed, Indiana was reduced to its current size and geography. By December 1816 the Indiana Territory was admitted to the Union as a state.

Starting in 1794, Native American titles to Indiana lands were extinguished by usurpation, purchase, or war and treaty. The United States acquired land from the Native Americans in the 1809 treaty of Fort Wayne, and by the treaty of St. Mary's in 1818 considerably more territory became property of the government. These two treaties resolved the occupation issue for the future Vigo County. Whites had been living in the area since 1811, when General Harrison erected a fort north of present-day Terre Haute. After the Indian skirmishes were resolved, settlers arrived in significant numbers beginning 1815.

The area in present-day Vigo County was first placed under local jurisdiction in 1790, when Knox County was created. This all-encompassing county was repeatedly subdivided as its lands were occupied − on 30 December 1816 a portion was partitioned to create Sullivan County, and on 21 January 1818 the northern portion of Sullivan was partitioned off to create Vigo County. The first county commissioners organized the government in 1818, including naming Terre Haute as its seat. The county's borders changed several times; in 1821, part of the county was formed into Parke County, and later that year Putnam County was formed which also affected Vigo's borders. The final change came in 1873 when the present boundaries were defined. The county is named for Colonel Francis Vigo, of Italian heritage but a citizen of Spain due to residence in St. Louis. He is credited with assisting George Rogers Clark, both in financing Clark's exploration and American Revolutionary War efforts, and in service as an agent obtaining military information for Clark against British campaigns on the then frontier.

Geography

To the north of Vigo County, the Wabash River defines the boundary between Vermillion and Parke counties; the river then enters Vigo County and winds to the south-southwest, defining the southern portion of the county's western border with Illinois before continuing south along Sullivan County's western border. Vigo County is thus the southernmost county in Indiana on the right bank of the Wabash. The county's low hills are devoted to agriculture or urban development; only the drainages and river-adjacent areas are still wooded.

Adjacent counties

 Vermillion County - north
 Parke County - northeast
 Clay County - east
 Sullivan County - south
 Clark County, Illinois - southwest
 Edgar County, Illinois - northwest

Cities
 Terre Haute (county seat)

Towns
 West Terre Haute
 Seelyville
 Riley (or Lockport)

Census-designated places

 Dresser (or Taylorville)
 Fontanet
 New Goshen
 North Terre Haute
 Shepardsville
 Tecumseh
 Toad Hop

Unincorporated communities

 Allendale
 Atherton
 Barnhart Town
 Blackhawk
 Brown Jug Corner
 Burnett
 Cherryvale
 Coal Bluff
 Cobb
 Dewey
 Duane Yards
 East Glenn
 Ehrmandale
 Ferguson Hill
 Glenn Ayr
 Gospel Grove
 Grange Corner
 Harrison
 Hickory Island
 Hutton
 Keller
 Larimer Hill
 Lewis
 Libertyville
 Liggett
 Marion Heights
 Markles
 Otter Creek Junction
 Parkview
 Pimento
 Pine Ridge
 Prairie Creek
 Prairieton
 Preston
 St. Mary-of-the-Woods
 Sandcut
 Sandford
 Shirkieville
 Southwood
 Spelterville
 Spring Hill
 State Line
 Swalls
 Tabertown
 Taylorville
 Terre Town
 Twelve Points
 Vigo
 West New Goshen
 Whitcomb Heights
 Woodgate
 Youngstown

Townships
The year after it was authorized, Vigo County was divided into four townships: Honey Creek Wabash, Harrison, and Independence. Prairie Creek Township was formed later that year. Otter Creek, Raccoon, and Sugar Creek townships were created in 1820, and Independence Township was renamed as Paris Township. Raccoon and Wabash townships became part of Parke County when it was partitioned from Vigo County in 1821. Nevins and Riley townships were formed in 1822. In 1824, Paris Township was renamed again to Fayette Township. Pierson Township was created in 1829; Lost Creek in 1831; Linton in 1841; and Prairieton Township in 1857.

 Fayette Township
 Harrison Township
 Honey Creek Township
 Linton Township
 Lost Creek Township
 Nevins Township
 Otter Creek Township
 Pierson Township
 Prairie Creek Township
 Prairieton Township
 Riley Township
 Sugar Creek Township

Highways
Interstate 70 passes through the southern part of Terre Haute from east to west on its way from Indianapolis to Saint Louis, Missouri; U.S. Route 40 roughly parallels Interstate 70 and passes through the middle of the city. Both highways intersect U.S. Route 41, coming from Chicago to the north; U.S. Route 150 enters from Paris, Illinois to the northwest and joins U.S. Route 41 in downtown Terre Haute, and both continue south toward Vincennes and Evansville.
  State Road 42
  State Road 46
  State Road 63
  State Road 159
  State Road 246
  State Road 340
  State Road 641

Rail
Several CSX Transportation railroad lines meet in Terre Haute; one enters from the north, another from the Indianapolis area, and another from Vincennes; and two others enter from Illinois. An Indiana Rail Road line runs southeast from Terre Haute toward Bedford.

Airports
The following public-use airports are located in the county:
 Terre Haute Regional Airport (HUF) in Terre Haute
 Sky King Airport (3I3) in North Terre Haute

Education
The public schools in the county are part of the Vigo County School Corporation. During the 2009–10 school year, the schools served a total of 16,014 students.

Vigo County is served by the Vigo County Public Library.

Colleges in Vigo County include Indiana State University and Rose-Hulman Institute of Technology. For a fuller list, see the List of schools in metropolitan Terre Haute.

Climate and weather

Government

The county government is a constitutional body, and is granted specific powers by the Constitution of Indiana, and by the Indiana Code. The county council is the fiscal body of the county government and controls spending and revenue collection in the county. Representatives, elected to four-year terms from county districts, are responsible for setting salaries, the annual budget, and special spending. The council has limited authority to impose local taxes, in the form of an income and property tax that is subject to state level approval, excise taxes, and service taxes.

A board of commissioners is the executive and legislative body of the county. Commissioners are elected county-wide to staggered four-year terms. One commissioner serves as president. The commissioners execute the acts of the county council, and manage the county government.

The county maintains a small claims court that handles civil cases. The judge on the court is elected to a term of four years and must be a member of the Indiana Bar Association. The judge is assisted by a constable who is also elected to a four-year term. In some cases, court decisions can be appealed to the state level circuit court.

The county has other elected offices, including sheriff, coroner, auditor, treasurer, recorder, surveyor, and circuit court clerk. These officers are elected to four-year terms. Members elected to county government positions are required to declare party affiliations and to be residents of the county.

Politics
The county has been regarded as one of the best bellwether regions in U.S. presidential elections. Between 1888 and 2016, it voted for the winning candidate in every election in all but two instances: 1908 and 1952. In 2020, its bellwether status came to an inglorious end when winner Joe Biden lost the county by nearly 15 points to Donald Trump.

The results in the county have often mirrored the nationwide popular vote. In every presidential election from 1960 to 2012, the county voted less than five percentage points from the national result. This changed in 2016, when the county voted 17 percentage points more Republican than the nation as a whole—a trend which persisted in 2020, when it voted 19 percentage points more Republican. In 2020 Donald Trump received 56.3 percent of the vote which was the best result for a Republican since Ronald Reagan in 1984 who received 58.4 percent of the vote.

In statewide races for governor and the U.S. Senate, Vigo County has in recent years become more receptive to candidates from the Democratic Party, even when the county had simultaneously voted for a Republican presidential victor in question. The county has gone Democratic in 9 of the last 10 gubernatorial races since 1980, and in 8 of the last 13 Senate races since that timeframe also.

Vigo is part of Indiana's 8th congressional district, which is held by Republican Larry Bucshon.

Demographics

2010 census
As of the 2010 United States Census, there were 107,848 people, 41,361 households, and 25,607 families in the county. The racial makeup of the county was 88.3% white, 6.9% black or African American, 1.7% Asian, 0.3% American Indian, 0.6% from other races, and 2.2% from two or more races. Those of Hispanic or Latino origin made up 2.3% of the population. In terms of ancestry, 22.6% were German, 20.2% were American, 12.2% were Irish, and 10.3% were English.

Of the 41,361 households, 30.2% had children under the age of 18 living with them, 43.9% were married couples living together, 13.1% had a female householder with no husband present, 38.1% were non-families, and 30.6% of all households were made up of individuals. The average household size was 2.38 and the average family size was 2.95. The median age was 36.1 years.

The median income for a household in the county was $47,697 and the median income for a family was $50,413. Males had a median income of $42,014 versus $30,217 for females. The per capita income for the county was $20,398. About 13.3% of families and 19.5% of the population were below the poverty line, including 27.5% of those under age 18 and 9.5% of those age 65 or over.

See also
 List of public art in Vigo County, Indiana
 National Register of Historic Places listings in Vigo County, Indiana
 Vigo County Courthouse

References

Bibliography

Further reading

External links
 Vigo County official website
 Vigo County Public Library

 
Indiana counties
1818 establishments in Indiana
States and territories established in 1818
Terre Haute metropolitan area